Annice is a given name. Notable people with the name include:

 Annice (slave) (died 1828), first female slave executed in Missouri
 Annice Sidwells (1902–2001), English singer
 Annice M. Wagner (born 1937), Chief Judge of the District of Columbia Court of Appeals